Psilichthys is an extinct genus of prehistoric bony fish from the Lower Cretaceous epoch of what is now Victoria, Australia. It has previously been referred to the family Birgeriidae; however it was removed from this family due to differences with Birgeria.

See also

 Prehistoric fish
 List of prehistoric bony fish

References 

Palaeonisciformes